Hydnochaete is a genus of hydnoid fungi in the family Hymenochaetaceae, order Hymenochaetales. All species are wood-rotting and produce brown to gray effused fruiting bodies. The genus is very close to Hymenochaete and can be considered its hydnoid counterpart.

Species list

Hydnochaete cinnamomea
Hydnochaete duportii
Hydnochaete japonica
Hydnochaete olivacea
Hydnochaete paucisetigera
Hydnochaete peroxydataae
Hydnochaete resupinata
Hydnochaete saepiaria
Hydnochaete setigera
Hydnochaete tabacinoides
Hydnochaete tuberculosa

Hymenochaetaceae
Agaricomycetes genera
Taxa named by Giacomo Bresadola
Taxa described in 1896